The 2014 Canadian Championship (officially the Amway Canadian Championship for sponsorship reasons) was a soccer tournament hosted and organized by the Canadian Soccer Association that took place in the cities of Edmonton, Montreal, Ottawa, Toronto and Vancouver in 2014. For the first time in the history of the tournament, the Ottawa Fury FC participated in addition to FC Edmonton, Montreal Impact, Toronto FC and Vancouver Whitecaps FC. The winner, Montreal Impact, was awarded the Voyageurs Cup and became Canada's entry into the Group Stage of the 2014–15 CONCACAF Champions League. It was the seventh edition of the annual Canadian Championship.

Matches

Bracket 

The three Major League Soccer  Canadian clubs are seeded according to their final position in 2013 league play. The fourth seed was allocated to the  winner of the preliminary round between the participating NASL clubs.

All rounds of the competition are played via a two-leg home-and-away knock-out format. The higher seeded team has the option of deciding which leg it played at home. The team that scores the greater aggregate of goals in the two matches advances. As in previous years, the team that came on top on aggregate for the two matches, Montreal Impact, was declared champion and earned the right to represent Canada in the 2014–15 CONCACAF Champions League.

 Each round is a two-game aggregate goal series with the away goals rule.

Preliminary Round 

FC Edmonton won 3–1 on aggregate.

Semifinals 

Montreal Impact won 5–4 on aggregate.

3–3 on aggregate, Toronto FC won 5–3 on penalties.

Final

First leg

Second leg

Top goalscorers

References 

2014
2014 in Canadian soccer
2014 domestic association football cups